Juanita Watkins (born May 11, 1939) is a former member of the Michigan House of Representatives.

Early life
Watkins was born on May 11, 1939 in Chicago, Illinois.

Education
Watkins graduated from Wendell Phillips High School. Later, she graduated from Wayne State University's Labor School.

Career
In 1976, Watkins was defeated in the Democratic primary for the Michigan House of Representatives seat representing the 20th district. On November 7, 1978, Watkins was elected to the Michigan House of Representatives where she represented the 20th district from January 10, 1979 to December 31, 1982. On November 2, 1982, Watkins was elected to the Michigan House of Representatives where she represented the 16th district from January 12, 1983 to December 31, 1990. In 1984, Watkins served as a delegate to Democratic National Convention from Michigan. In 1990, Watkins was defeated in the primary for the position of United States Representative from Michigan 13th District. In 1976, Watkins was defeated in the primary for the Michigan House of Representatives seat representing the 13th district.

Personal life
Watkins had four children. Watkins is a member of the NAACP.

References

Living people
1939 births
Politicians from Chicago
Wayne State University alumni
Women state legislators in Michigan
African-American women in politics
African-American state legislators in Michigan
Democratic Party members of the Michigan House of Representatives
20th-century African-American women
20th-century African-American politicians
21st-century African-American women
21st-century African-American people
20th-century American women politicians
20th-century American politicians